Chris Waterman (born 19 September 1968) is a former Australian rules football player and coach. Waterman’s playing career started in Rossmoyne’s junior football zone where he was eventually recruited by the East Fremantle Football Club at the age of fifteen. He played in the club’s Colts, Reserves and Senior line-up and finished with a total of 61 senior games. In 1988 Waterman made his AFL debut wearing a West Coast Eagles guernsey, and under the guidance of coaches John Todd and Mick Malthouse, went on to play a total of 177 matches (including 22 AFL finals, 3 Grand Finals and 2 Premierships) for the club and earned "Player Life Member" status. Chris retired in 1998.

In 1999 Waterman began his coaching career, taking the role of defensive coach for his former club, the West Coast Eagles. in 2001, he was appointed defensive coach of the Fremantle Dockers until the end of 2005. Waterman also coached both the 2004 and 2005 Western Australian State teams and was assistant coach for the 2007 and 2008 State Team.

In 2006, Chris Waterman became the Senior Coach of the Peel Thunder Football Club and in 2008 signed a 3-year contract which would see him remain at the club until 2010.

At the end of the 2009 WAFL season, Chris Waterman resigned as head coach of Peel Thunder and is currently looking to get back into the coaching at AFL level. 

Waterman's sons, Alec and Jake were both drafted by the West Coast under the Father–son rule, although Alec now plays for  Essendon.

Statistics

|-
|- style="background-color: #EAEAEA"
! scope="row" style="text-align:center" | 1988
|style="text-align:center;"|
| 31 || 7 || 2 || 2 || 89 || 18 || 107 || 27 || 7 || 0.3 || 0.3 || 12.7 || 2.6 || 15.3 || 3.9 || 1.0 || 0
|-
! scope="row" style="text-align:center" | 1989
|style="text-align:center;"|
| 31 || 10 || 10 || 3 || 110 || 38 || 148 || 42 || 12 || 1.0 || 0.3 || 11.0 || 3.8 || 14.8 || 4.2 || 1.2 || 0
|- style="background-color: #EAEAEA"
! scope="row" style="text-align:center" | 1990
|style="text-align:center;"|
| 31 || 6 || 13 || 9 || 49 || 16 || 65 || 25 || 10 || 2.2 || 1.5 || 8.2 || 2.7 || 10.8 || 4.2 || 1.7 || 0
|-
! scope="row" style="text-align:center" | 1991
|style="text-align:center;"|
| 39 || 26 || 6 || 3 || 308 || 127 || 435 || 65 || 29 || 0.2 || 0.1 || 11.8 || 4.9 || 16.7 || 2.5 || 1.1 || 2
|- style="background-color: #EAEAEA"
|style="text-align:center;background:#afe6ba;"|1992†
|style="text-align:center;"|
| 39 || 24 || 6 || 6 || 287 || 118 || 405 || 98 || 48 || 0.3 || 0.3 || 12.0 || 4.9 || 16.9 || 4.1 || 2.0 || 0
|-
! scope="row" style="text-align:center" | 1993
|style="text-align:center;"|
| 39 || 20 || 15 || 20 || 224 || 108 || 332 || 92 || 28 || 0.8 || 1.0 || 11.2 || 5.4 || 16.6 || 4.6 || 1.4 || 2
|- style="background-color: #EAEAEA"
|style="text-align:center;background:#afe6ba;"|1994†
|style="text-align:center;"|
| 39 || 18 || 3 || 4 || 127 || 56 || 183 || 54 || 17 || 0.2 || 0.2 || 7.1 || 3.1 || 10.2 || 3.0 || 0.9 || 0
|-
! scope="row" style="text-align:center" | 1995
|style="text-align:center;"|
| 39 || 20 || 8 || 7 || 243 || 120 || 363 || 103 || 28 || 0.4 || 0.4 || 12.2 || 6.0 || 18.2 || 5.2 || 1.4 || 10
|- style="background-color: #EAEAEA"
! scope="row" style="text-align:center" | 1996
|style="text-align:center;"|
| 39 || 12 || 7 || 7 || 161 || 55 || 216 || 55 || 19 || 0.6 || 0.6 || 13.4 || 4.6 || 18.0 || 4.6 || 1.6 || 0
|-
! scope="row" style="text-align:center" | 1997
|style="text-align:center;"|
| 39 || 12 || 0 || 1 || 114 || 68 || 182 || 41 || 15 || 0.0 || 0.1 || 9.5 || 5.7 || 15.2 || 3.4 || 1.3 || 0
|- style="background-color: #EAEAEA"
! scope="row" style="text-align:center" | 1998
|style="text-align:center;"|
| 39 || 22 || 5 || 10 || 265 || 146 || 411 || 112 || 30 || 0.2 || 0.5 || 12.0 || 6.6 || 18.7 || 5.1 || 1.4 || 1
|- class="sortbottom"
! colspan=3| Career
! 177
! 75
! 72
! 1977
! 870
! 2847
! 714
! 243
! 0.4
! 0.4
! 11.2
! 4.9
! 16.1
! 4.0
! 1.4
! 15
|}

Notes 

West Coast Eagles players
West Coast Eagles Premiership players
East Fremantle Football Club players
1968 births
Living people
Western Australian State of Origin players
Peel Thunder Football Club coaches
Australian rules footballers from Western Australia
Subiaco Football Club coaches
Two-time VFL/AFL Premiership players